The Afternoon Meal (in Spanish, La Merienda) is a mid-eighteenth-century still life painting by Spanish painter Luis Egidio Meléndez (1716–1780).

It was created around 1772. Done in oil on canvas, the painting depicts an assortment of fruits and bread set before a stark background. 

The painting is a straight-sided ogee frame with sculpted Rococo corners and shallow-relief details, collected by the Metropolitan Museum of Art.

References 

Spanish paintings
1772 paintings
Paintings in the collection of the Metropolitan Museum of Art